Philippe Redon (12 December 1950 – 12 May 2020) was a French football player and manager.

Playing career
Redon played for Stade Rennais, Red Star, Paris SG, Girondins de Bordeaux, FC Metz, Stade Lavallois, FC Rouen, Papeete, AS Saint-Étienne and US Créteil.

Managerial career
After his playing career, he became a coach with US Créteil, RC Lens, Cameroon and Liberia. He was also an assistant coach at Stade Rennais.

References

External links
Profile
Career overview
Profile - FC Metz

1950 births
2020 deaths
Sportspeople from Ille-et-Vilaine
Association football forwards
French footballers
Stade Rennais F.C. players
Red Star F.C. players
Paris Saint-Germain F.C. players
FC Girondins de Bordeaux players
FC Metz players
Stade Lavallois players
FC Rouen players
AS Saint-Étienne players
US Créteil-Lusitanos players
Ligue 1 players
Ligue 2 players
French football managers
US Créteil-Lusitanos managers
RC Lens managers
1992 African Cup of Nations managers
Cameroon national football team managers
Liberia national football team managers
University of Rennes alumni
Footballers from Brittany
Expatriate football managers in Cameroon
Expatriate football managers in Liberia